John Wagner has worked on a wide range of British comics most notably working on Judge Dredd and the various spin-offs.

Wagner has often written under a number of pseudonyms, including John Howard, T. B. Grover and Keef Ripley.

IPC/Fleetway
Wagner broke into writing comics in 1971 in partnership with Pat Mills, writing scripts for IPC humour comics like Cor!! and Whizzer and Chips.

Valiant
"Yellowknife of the Yard", co-written with Pat Mills, art by Douglas Maxted, 1971
"One-Eyed Jack", art by John Cooper, 1975–76 (continued with other writers in Battle Picture Weekly, 1976); later reprinted in Eagle"Soldier Sharp", art by Joe Colquhoun, 1976; continued in Battle Picture Weekly, 1976

Jet
"Patridge's Patch", co-written with Pat Mills, art by Mike Western, 1971

Tammy
"School for Snobs", co-written with Pat Mills, 1971
"Bella at the Bar", one of several writers, art by John Armstrong, 1974–

Lion
"The Can-Do Kids", co-written with Pat Mills, c. 1971-2

Sandie
"Jeannie and her Uncle Meanie", c. 1973

Battle Picture Weekly
"Rat Pack", one of several writers, 1975–76
"The Flight of the Golden Hinde", one of several writers, 1975
"The Bootneck Boy", one of several writers, 1975–77
"Lofty's One-Man Luftwaffe", one of several writers, 1975
"D-Day Dawson", one of several writers, 1975–77
"The Fortrose Falcon", first episode, remainder written by Eric Hebden, 1975
"They Can't Stop Bullet", one of several writers, 1975
"Battle Badge of Bravery", one of several writers, 1975
"Return of the Eagle", one of several writers, 1975–76
"Darkie's Mob", art by Mike Western, 1976–77; reprinted in the Judge Dredd Megazine, 2003; hardcover, Titan Books, April 2010, 
"Joe Two Beans", art by Eric Bradbury, 1977
"Gaunt", art by John Cooper, 1977
"HMS Nightshade", art by Mike Western, 1978–79
"Fight for the Falklands", art by Jim Watson, 1982–83
"Invasion 1984!" co-written with Alan Grant (credited to R. Clark), art by Eric Bradbury, 1983

Action
"Black Jack", #1–30, 1976–1977 (later episodes written by Jack Adrian)

The 2000 AD group

Work done for 2000 AD, Starlord and Judge Dredd MegazineM.A.C.H. 1 (in 2000 AD #9 & 16, 1977)
Judge Dredd:
 Complete Case Files Volume 1 (336 pages, December 2005)
 Judge Dredd, 2000 AD #9–18, 20–23, 25–28, 32–60, 1977–78, including:
"The Robot Wars", art by Carlos Ezquerra, Ron Turner, Mike McMahon and Ian Gibson, #10–17
 Complete Case Files Volume 2 (320 pages, February 2006)
Judge Dredd, 2000 AD #61–115, 1978–79, including:
The Day the Law Died", art by various, #89–108
 Complete Case Files Volume 3 (240 pages, April 2006)
Judge Dredd, 2000 AD #116–151, 1979–80, including:
"Judge Death", art by Brian Bolland, #149–151
 Complete Case Files Volume 4 (336 pages, June 2006)
Judge Dredd, 2000 AD #155–182 & 184–207, 1980–81, including:
"The Judge Child", co-written with Alan Grant, art by Brian Bolland, Mike McMahon and Ron Smith, #156–181
 Complete Case Files Volume 5 (384 pages, October 2006)
Judge Dredd, 2000 AD #208–270, 1981–82, including:
"Judge Death Lives", co-written with Alan Grant, art by Brian Bolland, #224–228
"Block Mania", co-written with Alan Grant, art by Mike McMahon, Ron Smith, Steve Dillon and Brian Bolland, #236–244
"The Apocalypse War", co-written with Alan Grant, art by Carlos Ezquerra, #245–270
 Complete Case Files Volume 6 (336 pages, November 2006)
Judge Dredd, 2000 AD #271–321, 1982–83
 Complete Case Files Volume 7 (352 pages, March 2007)
Judge Dredd, 2000 AD #322–375, 1983–84
 Complete Case Files Volume 8 (336 pages, May 2007)
Judge Dredd, 2000 AD #375–423, 1984–85, including
"City of the Damned", co-written with Alan Grant, art by various, #293–406
 Complete Case Files Volume 9 (357 pages, November 2007)
Judge Dredd, 2000 AD #424–473, 1985–86
 Complete Case Files Volume 10 (368 pages, June 2008)
Judge Dredd, 2000 AD #474–522, 1986–87
 Complete Case Files Volume 11 (368 pages, October 2008) includes:
Judge Dredd, 2000 AD #523–570, 1987–88, including:
"Oz", co-written with Alan Grant, art by various, #545–570
 Complete Case Files Volume 12 (336 pages, January 2009)
Judge Dredd, 2000 AD #571–586, 588–597, 599, 601, 603–606, 608–612, 615–618, 1988–89
 Complete Case Files Volume 13 (272 pages, July 2009)
Judge Dredd, 2000 AD #620–621, 623–626, 632–635, 638–639, 641–646, 648–655, 657–658, 661, 1989–90
 Complete Case Files Volume 14 (272 pages, November 2009)
Judge Dredd, 2000 AD #662–699, 1990, including
"Tale of the Dead Man", art by Will Simpson, Jeff Anderson, 662–668
"Necropolis", art by Carlos Ezquerra, #669–699 (including "Countdown to Necropolis" episodes)
 Complete Case Files Volume 15 (320 pages, April 2010)
Judge Dredd, 2000 AD #700–710, 716–718, 721–726, 1990–91
Judge Dredd, Judge Dredd Megazine Vol 1 #1–3 & 7–9, 1990–1991
 Complete Case Files Volume 16 (336 pages, August 2010)
Judge Dredd, 2000 AD #739, 750–753, 1991–92
 Complete Case Files Volume 17 (304 pages, February 2011)
Judge Dredd, Judge Dredd Megazine Vol 2 #1–3, 1992
 Complete Case Files Volume 18 (304 pages, September 2011)
Judge Dredd, Judge Dredd Megazine Vol 2 #12–18, 21–26, 1992–93, including:
"Mechanismo", art by Colin MacNeil, Vol 2 #12–27
"Mechanismo Returns", art by Peter Doherty, Vol 2 #22–26
 Complete Case Files Volume 19 (320 pages, May 2012)
Judge Dredd, Judge Dredd Megazine Vol 2 #31–43, 1993, including:
"Mechanismo: Body Count", art by Manuel Benet, Vol 2 #37–43Judge Dredd: The Complete P.J. Maybe (192 pages, September 2006) collects:
 "Bug" (with co-author Alan Grant and art by Liam Sharp, in 2000 AD #534, 1987)
 "PJ Maybe, Age 13 " (with art by Liam Sharp, in 2000 AD #592–594, 1988)
 "The Further Adventures of PJ Maybe, Age 14" (with art by Liam Sharp, in 2000 AD #599, 1988)
 "The Confeshuns of PJ Maybe" (with art by Liam Sharp, in 2000 AD #632–634, 1989)
 "Wot I Did During Necropolis" (with art by Anthony Williams, in 2000 AD #707–709, 1990)
 "The All New Adventures of P. J. Maybe" (with art by Peter Doherty, in 2000 AD #1204, 2000)
 "You're a Better Man Than I Am, Gunga Dinsdale" (with art by Ben Oliver, in 2000 AD #1210, 2000)
 "Bring Me the Heart of P. J. Maybe" (with art by Ben Oliver, in 2000 AD #1211, 2000)
 "Six" (with art by Chris Weston, in Judge Dredd Megazine #221–222, 2004)
 "The Monsterus Mashinashuns of P.J. Maybe" (with art by Carlos Ezquerra, in Judge Dredd Megazine #231–234, 2005)
 "Bury My Knee at Wounded Heart" (with Peter Doherty, in Judge Dredd Megazine vol. 2 #46, February 1994)
Judge Dredd (in Judge Dredd Megazine vol.2 # 46–48 & 50–69, 1994)
Judge Dredd (in Judge Dredd Megazine vol.2 # 70–83, 1995)
 "Terror with Mrs. Gunderson" (with Jason Brashill, in Judge Dredd Megazine vol. 2 #80, May 1995)
 "Language Barrier" (with Jason Brashill, in 2000 AD #950, July 1995)
Judge Dredd (in Judge Dredd Megazine vol.3 # 2–7 & 9–10, 1995)
 The Pit (tpb, Hamlyn, 1997, Rebellion 2008) collects:
 "The Pit" (with Carlos Ezquerra, Colin MacNeil and Lee Sullivan, in 2000 AD #970–983, 
 "True Grot" (with Alex Ronald, in 2000 AD #984–986, March–April 1996)
 "Unjudicial Liaisons" (with Carlos Ezquerra, in 2000 AD #987–989
 "Last Rites" (with Lee Sullivan, in 2000 AD #990
 "Declaration of War" (with Lee Sullivan, in 2000 AD #991
 "Bongo War" (with Lee Sullivan, Alex Ronald and Carlos Ezquerra, in 2000 AD #992–999, May–July, 1996)
 "Lethal Weapon" (with Jason Brashill, in Judge Dredd Megazine vol. 3 #17, May 1996)
 "My Beautiful Career" (with Alex Ronald, in 2000 AD #1010, September 1996)
 "View From a Window" (with Eoin Covenay, in Judge Dredd Megazine vol. 3 #22, October 1996)
 The Hunting Party (August 2006) collects:
 "The Pack (with Henry Flint, in 2000 AD #1014–1016, 1996)
 "The Hunting Party" (with Sean Phillips, #1033, 1997)
 "Lost in Americana" (with Trevor Hairsine, #1034–1036, 1997)
 "Fog on the Eerie" (with Calum Alexander Watt, #1037–1040, 1997)
 "Dance of the Spider Queen," art by Henry Flint, #1041–1044, 1997)
 "Camp Demento" (with Jason Brashill, in 2000 AD #1045–1046, June 1997)
 "Shark Country" (with David Bircham, #1047–1048, 1997)
 "Trail of the Man-Eaters," art by Henry Flint, #1048–1049, 1997)
 "A Walk In Gang Alley" (with Alex Ronald, in 2000 AD #1062, September 1997)
 "Ojay" (with Alex Ronald, in Judge Dredd Megazine vol. 3 #34, October 1997)
 "Simple Domestic" (with Steve Tappin, in Judge Dredd Megazine vol. 3 #35, November 1997)
 "In the Year 2120" (with Jason Brashill, in 2000 AD #1077, January 1998)
 "No More Jimmy Deans" (with Trevor Hairsine, in Judge Dredd Megazine vol. 3 #39, March 1998)
 "Headbangers" (with Alex Ronald, in 2000 AD #1084, March 1998)
Judge Dredd (in Judge Dredd Megazine vol.3 #40–47, 1998)
 "Revenge of the Taxidermist" (with Trevor Hairsine, in 2000 AD #1087–1089, 1998)
 "Angel of Mercy" (with Alex Ronald, in 2000 AD #1090–1091, April 1998)
 "Death Becomes Him" (with Alex Ronald, in 2000 AD #1114–1115, October 1998)
 "Christmas Angel" (with Jason Brashill, in 2000 AD #1123–1124, December 1998)
 "Revenge of the Taxidermist" (with Trevor Hairsine, in 2000 AD #1087–1089, 1998)
 "The Scorpion Dance" (with John Burns, in 2000 AD #1125–1132, December 1998 – February 1999)
 "The Contract" (with Cam Kennedy, in Judge Dredd Megazine vol. 3 #50, February 1999)
 "Alien Town's Burning" (with Cam Kennedy, in 2000 AD #1133–1134, February–March 1999)
 "There Be Dragons" (with Greg Staples, in Judge Dredd Megazine vol. 3 #51, March 1999)
 "Banzai Battalion" (with Henry Flint, in 2000 AD #1135–1137, March 1999)
 "The Doomsday Scenario":Judge Dredd: Doomsday for Mega-City One (Hamlyn, 2001) collects:
 "The Connection" (with Andrew Currie, in Judge Dredd Megazine vol. 3 #52–55, April–July 1999)
 "Doomsday" (art by Colin Wilson and Mike Collins, in Judge Dredd Megazine vol. 3 #56–59, August–November 1999)
 "Volt Face" (with Colin Wilson, 2000 AD #1167, October 1999)Judge Dredd: Doomsday for Dredd (Hamlyn, 2001) collects:
 "Return of the Assassin" (with Cam Kennedy, in 2000 AD #1141–1147, April–June 1999)
 "The Trial" (art by Simon Davis, in 2000 AD #1148–1150, June 1999)
 "Trial of Strength" (art by Neil Googe/Stephen Baskerville, in 2000 AD#1151–1152, July 1999)
 "War Games" (with Neil Googe, Mike McMahon, Charlie Adlard, Andy Clarke/Stephen Baskerville, and Colin Wilson, in 2000 AD #1153–1159, July–September 1999)
 "Endgame" (with Charlie Adlard, in 2000 AD #1160–1164, September–October 1999)
 "Termination (With Extreme)" (with Alex Ronald, in 2000 AD #1139–1140, April 1999)
 "A Night with Judge Death" (with art by Andy Clarke, in 2000 AD #1168, 1999)
 "No Man's Land" (with Cam Kennedy, in 2000 AD #1183–1185, 2000)
 "Blood Cadets" (with Simon Fraser, in 2000 AD #1186–1188, 2000)
 "Lobsang Rampage" (with art by Andy Clarke, in Judge Dredd Megazine (vol. 3) #61, 2000)
 "J. D. Megson" (with Henry Flint, in Judge Dredd Megazine vol.3 #63, 2000)
 "Dead Ringer" (with Duncan Fegredo (64), Jock (65), Wayne Reynolds (66), Simon Coleby/Anthony Williams (67), Ben Oliver (68) and Richard Elson (69), in Judge Dredd Megazine vol.3 #64–69, 2000)
 "Ten Years" (with Jock, in Judge Dredd Megazine vol.3 #70, 2000)
 "Cold Comfort" (with Anthony Williams, in 2000 AD #1225, 2001)
 "Star Drekk: A Space Fantasy" (with Anthony Williams, in 2000 AD #1232, 2001)
 "Zoom Time" (with Simon Fraser, in 2000 AD #1311, 2002)
 "My Beautiful Career" (with Simon Coleby, in Judge Dredd Megazine #215, 2004)
 "After the Bombs" (with Jason Brashill, in 2000 AD #1420–1422, January 2005)
 "PF" (with Arthur Ranson, in 2000 AD #1476, 2006)Origins (160 pages, May 2006) collects:
 "The Connection" (with Kev Walker, in 2000 AD #1500–1504, 2006)
 "Origins" (with Carlos Ezquerra, in 2000 AD #1505–1519, 1529–1535, 2006–2007)Tour of Duty: The Backlash (272 pages, September 2010) collects:
 "The Streets of Dan Francisco" (with Rufus Dayglo, in 2000 AD #1520, 2007)
 "Fifty-Year Man" (with Patrick Goddard, in 2000 AD #1536, 2007)
 "Mutants in Mega-City One" (with Colin MacNeil, in 2000 AD #1542–1545, 2007)
 "The Facility" (with Colin MacNeil, in 2000 AD #1546, 2007)
 "The Secret of Mutant Camp 5" (with Colin MacNeil, in 2000 AD #1547–1548, 2007)
 "The Spirit of Christmas" (with Colin MacNeil, in 2000 AD Prog 2008, 2007)
 "Emphatically Evil: The Life and Crimes of PJ Maybe" (with Colin MacNeil, in 2000 AD #1569–1575, 2008)
 "...Regrets" (with Nick Dyer, in 2000 AD #1577–1581, 2008)
 "The Edgar Case" (with pencils by Patrick Goddard and inks by Lee Townsend, in 2000 AD # 1589–1595, 2008)
 "Mutie Block" (with Kev Walker, in 2000 AD #1600–1603, 2008)
 "Backlash" (with Carl Critchlow, in 2000 AD #1628–1633, 2009)
 "The Sexmek Slasher" (with Vince Locke, in 2000 AD #1521, 2007)
 "The Gingerbread Man" (with Henry Flint, in Judge Dredd Megazine #261–263, 2007)
 "Mandroid: Instrument of War" (with Simon Coleby, in 2000 AD #1555–1556, 2007)
 "Still Mental After All These Years" (with Cliff Robinson, in 2000 AD #1608, 2008)
 "Ratfink" (with Peter Doherty, in Judge Dredd Megazine #273–277, 2008)
 "The Ecstasy" (with Paul Marshall, in 2000 AD #1617–1626, January–March 2009)Tour of Duty: Mega-City Justice (June 2011) collects:
 "Under New Management" (with Carl Critchlow, in 2000 AD #1649, August 2009)
 "Tour of Duty" (with Colin MacNeil, in 2000 AD #1569–1575, August–September 2008)
 "Tour of Duty Interlude: Mega-City One" (with P. J. Holden, in 2000 AD #1656, October 2009)
 "The New Deal" (with Mike Collins, in 2000 AD #1657)
 "Snake" (with Mike Collins, in 2000 AD #1658)
 "Pink Eyes" (with Mike Collins, in 2000 AD #1659–1663)
 "Gore City" (with Colin MacNeil, in 2000 AD #1664–1667 and Prog 2010, 2009–2010)
 "The Talented Mayor Ambrose," (with John Higgins (parts 1–5 and 11–12), Colin MacNeil (parts 6–10), and Mike Collins (part 13), in 2000 AD #1674–1686)
 "Mega-City Justice" (with Carlos Ezquerra, in 2000 AD #1687–1693)Shako! (with co-author Pat Mills (1–4) and various artists, in 2000 AD #20–35, 1977, collected in Extreme Edition #18, 2006)Strontium Dog (with art by Carlos Ezquerra, except where indicated):
 Search/Destroy Agency Files: Volume 1 (336 pages, January 2007) collects:
 "Max Quirxx" (in Starlord #1–2, 1978)
 "Papa Por-ka" (in Starlord #3–5, 1978)
 "No Cure For Kansyr" (in Starlord #6–7, 1978)
 "Planet Of The Dead" (in Starlord #8–10, 1978)
 "Two-Faced Terror!" (in Starlord #12–15, 1978)
 "Demon Maker" #17–19 (with art by Brendan McCarthy (17) and Ian Gibson (18–19), in Starlord #17–19, 1978)
 "The Ultimate Weapon" (in Starlord #21–22, 1978)
 "The Galaxy Killers" (in 2000 AD #86–94, 1978)
 "Journey Into Hell" (in 2000 AD #104–118, 1979)
 "Death's Head" (with co-author Alan Grant, in 2000 AD #178–181, 1980)
 "The Schiklegruber Grab" (with co-author Alan Grant, in 2000 AD #182–188, 1980)
 "Mutie's Luck" (with co-author Alan Grant, in 2000 AD #189, 1980)
 "The Doc Quince Case" (with co-author Alan Grant, in 2000 AD #190–193, 1980–1981)
 "The Bad Boys Bust" (with co-author Alan Grant, in 2000 AD #194–197, 1981)
 Search/Destroy Agency Files: Volume 2 (with co-author Alan Grant, 288 pages, June 2007) collects:
 "Portrait Of a Mutant" (in 2000 AD #200–206, 210–221, 1981)
 "The Gronk Affair" (in 2000 AD #224–227, 1981)
 "The Kid Knee Caper" (in 2000 AD #228–233, 1981)
 "The Moses Incident" (in 2000 AD #335–345, 1983)
 "The Killing" (in 2000 AD #350–359, 1984)
 "Outlaw!" (in 2000 AD #363–385, 1984)
 Search/Destroy Agency Files: Volume 3 (with co-author Alan Grant, 384 pages, September 2007) collects:
 "The Big Bust Of ’49" (in 2000 AD #415–424, 1985)
 "The Slavers Of Drule" (in 2000 AD #425–436, 1985)
 "Max Bubba" (in 2000 AD #445–465, 1985–1986)
 "Smiley's World" (in 2000 AD #466–467, 1986)
 "Rage" (in 2000 AD #469–489, 1986)
 "Incident On Mayjer Minor" (in 2000 AD #490–496, 1986)
 "Warzone!" (in 2000 AD #497–499, 1986)
 Search/Destroy Agency Files: Volume 4 (with co-author Alan Grant, 352 pages, January 2008) collects:
 "Bitch" (in 2000 AD #505–529, 1987)
 "The Royal Affair" (in 2000 AD #532–536, 1987)
 "A Sorry Case" (with art by Colin MacNeil, in 2000 AD #540–543, 1987)
 "The Rammy" (in 2000 AD #544–553, 1987)
"The Stone Killers" (written by Grant alone; 2000 AD #560–572, 1988)
"Incident On Zeta" (written by Grant alone; plot suggested by Carlos Ezquerra; 2000 AD #573, 1988)
"The No-Go Job" (written by Grant alone; art by Simon Harrison; 2000 AD #580–587, 1988)
"Fever" (art by Kim Raymond; 2000 AD Annual 1987)
"Complaint" (2000 AD Annual 1988)
"Incident at the End of the World" (art by Keith Page; 2000 AD Annual 1991, 1990)
"Assault on Trigol 3" (written by Steve MacManus, art by Rob Moran; 2000 AD Sci-fi Special 1989)
"An Untold Tale of Johnny Alpha" (written by Peter Hogan, art by John Ridgway; 2000 AD Sci-fi Special 1992)The Final Solution (160 pages, May, 2008)
"The Final Solution" (part 1 - written by Grant alone; art by Simon Harrison; 2000 AD #600–606, 615–621, 636–641, 645–647, 1988–89)
"The Final Solution" (part 2 - written by Grant alone; art by Colin MacNeil; 2000 AD #682–687, 1990)
"Incident at the Birth of the Universe" (written by Grant alone; art by Kev Walker; 2000 AD Winter Special 1988)
"The Town that Died of Shame" (written by Grant alone; art by Brendan McCarthy and Colin MacNeil; 2000 AD Sci-Fi Special 1988)
"Judge Dredd: Top Dogs" (art by Colin MacNeil; Judge Dredd Annual 1991, 1990)
 "The Kreeler Conspiracy" (in Prog 2000, 2000 AD #1174–1180, 1195–1199, 1999–2000)
 "The Sad Case" (in Prog 2001, 2000)
 "Roadhouse" (in 2000 AD #1300–1308, 2002)
 "The Tax Dodge" (in 2000 AD #1350–1358, 2003)
 "The Headly Foot Job" (in 2000 AD #1400–1403, 2004)
 "Traitor To His Kind" (in 2000 AD #1406–1415, 2004)
 "A Shaggy Dog Story" (in Prog 2006, 2000 AD #1469–1472, 2005–2006)
 "The Glum Affair" (in Prog 2008, 2000 AD #1567–1576, 2007–2008)
 "Blood Moon" (with co-artist Hector Ezquerra, in 2000 AD #1617-1628, 2009)
 "The Mork Whisperer" (in 2000 AD #1651–1660, 2010)
 "The Life and Death of Jonny Alpha" (in 2000 AD #1689–1699, 2010)
 "The Life and Death of Jonny Alpha Book II: The Project" (in 2000 AD Prog 2012, #1764–1771, 2011–2012)
 "The Life and Death of Jonny Alpha Book III: Mutant Spring" (in 2000 AD Prog 2013, #1813–1821, 2012–2013)
 "The Life and Death of Jonny Alpha Book IV: Dogs of War" (in 2000 AD Prog 2014,  #1862–1870, 2013–2014)
 "The Stix Fix" (in 2000 AD #1924–1933, 2015)
 "Repo Men" (in 2000 AD #1961–1971, 2015–2016)
 Uncollected:
 "The Son" (in 2000 AD #2073–2081, 2018)
Robo-Hunter (art by Ian Gibson):
 Robo-Hunter (in 2000 AD # 76–85 & 100–112, 1978–79)
 Robo-Hunter (in 2000 AD # 152–174, 1980)
Robo-Hunter (in 2000 AD # 259–272, 275–281 & 283–288, 1982)
Robo-Hunter (in 2000 AD # 292–307, 1982–83)
Robo-Hunter (in 2000 AD # 312–334, 1983)
Robo-Hunter (in 2000 AD # 435–443, 1985)Ace Trucking Co. (with co-author Alan Grant and art by Massimo Belardinelli, unless noted):
 The Complete Ace Trucking Co. Volume 1 (320 pages ) collects:
 "The Kleggs" (in 2000 AD #232–236, 1981)
 "Hell's Pocket" (with art by Ian Gibson, in 2000 AD #239–243, 1981)
 "Lugjack" (in 2000 AD #244–250, 1982)
 "The Great Mush Rush" (in 2000 AD #251–258, 1982)
 "The Ughbug Bloos" (in 2000 AD #259, 1982)
 "Last Lug To Abbo Dabbo" (in 2000 AD #260–267, 1982)
 "Joobaloo" (in 2000 AD #268–272, 1982)
 "Too Many Bams" (in 2000 AD #273–278, 1982)
 "The Kloistar Run" (in 2000 AD #279–285, 1982)
 "Stoop Coop Soup" (in 2000 AD #288–293, 1982)
 The Complete Ace Trucking Co. Volume 2 (336 pages ) collects:
 "Bamfeezled" (2000AD Sci-Fi Special 1982)
 "On The Dangle" (in 2000 AD #378–386, 1984)
 "Strike!" (in 2000 AD #387–390 and 392–400, 1984–1985)
 "The Croakside Trip" (in 2000 AD #428–433, 1985)
 "Stowaway Lugjacker" (in 2000 AD Annual 1986, 1985)
 "Whatever Happened to Ace Garp?" (in 2000 AD #451, 1986)
 "The Doppelgarp" (in 2000 AD #452–472, 1986)
 "The Garpetbaggers" (in 2000 AD #475–483 and 485–498, 1986)
 "The Homecoming" (in 2000 AD Annual 1989, 1988)Anderson: Psi Division (with co-author Alan Grant):
 "The Mind of Edward Bottlebum" (with art by Ian Gibson, Judge Dredd Annual 1985, 1984)
 "Revenge" (with art by Brett Ewins (1–7), Cliff Robinson (8–10, 12) and Robin Smith (11), in 2000 AD  #416–427, 1985)The Helltrekkers (with José Ortiz, in 2000 AD # 387–415, 1984–1985)Tales from Mega-City One:
Tales from Mega-City One (in 2000 AD # 523, 525–26, 532–34 & 539, 1987)
Tales from Mega-City One (in 2000 AD # 605, 1988)Chopper "Soul on Fire" (with Colin MacNeil, in 2000 AD #594–597, 1988)
 "Song of the Surfer" (with Colin MacNeil, in 2000 AD #654–665, 1989)
 "The Big Meg" (with Dylan Teague, in 2000 AD #1387–1394, 2004)The Dead Man (in 2000 AD # 650–662, 1989–90)
 America (with Colin MacNeil):
 "America" (in Judge Dredd Megazine vol.1 #1–7, 1990–1091)
 "Fading of the Light" (in Judge Dredd Megazine vol.3 #20–25, 1996–1097)Judge Death:
 "Young Death" (with Peter Doherty, in Judge Dredd Megazine vol.1 #1–12, 1990–1991, collected in Young Death: Boyhood of a Superfiend, May 2008)
 "Tea With Mrs. Gunderson" (with Dean Ormston, in Judge Dredd Megazine vol.2 #15, 1992)My Name is Death (with Frazer Irving, 112 pages, 2005) collects:
 "My Name is Death" (in 2000 AD #1289–1294, 2002)
 "The Wilderness Days" (in Judge Dredd Megazine #209–216, 2003–2004)Al's Baby (with Carlos Ezquerra, reprinted in Extreme Edition #16, 2006):
 "Al's Baby" (in Judge Dredd Megazine vol.1 #4–15, 1991)
 "Blood on the Bib" (in Judge Dredd Megazine vol.2 #16–24, 1992–1993)
 "Public Enemy No. 1" (in 2000 AD #1034–1044, 1997)Mean Machine:
 "Travels with Muh Shrink" (with Richard Dolan, in 2000 AD # 730–736, 1991)
 "Son of Mean Machine" (with Carl Critchlow, in Judge Dredd Megazine vol.2 # 63–72 & 82, 1994–1995)
 "Visiting Time" (with John Hicklenton, in Judge Dredd Megazine vol.2 #82, 1995)
 "Angel Heart" (with David Millgate, in Judge Dredd Megazine #218–220, 2004)Brit-Cit Babes (with Steve Sampson, in Judge Dredd Megazine vol.1 #16–20, 1992)Button Man:
 "Book I: The Killing Game" (with Arthur Ranson, in 2000 AD #780–791, 1992)
 "Book II: Confession" (with Arthur Ranson, in 2000 AD #904–919, 1994)
 "Book 3" (with Arthur Ranson, in 2000 AD prog 2001 & #1223–1233, 2001)
 "Book IV: The Hitman's Daughter" (with Frazer Irving, in 2000 AD #1551-1566, 2007)I Was a Teenage Tax Consultant (with Ian Gibson, in 2000 AD # 1050–1059, 1997)Predator vs. Judge Dredd (with art by Enrique Alcatera, in Judge Dredd Megazine vol.3 #36–38, Dark Horse, 3-issue mini-series, 1997, collected in tpb, 80 pages, Titan, 1998, Dark Horse Comics, 1999)The Balls Brothers (with Kev Walker):
 "Heroes for Hire" (in 2000 AD #1128–1131, 1999)
 "Balls to Biloxi" (in 2000 AD #1141–1147, 1999)Banzai Battalion (80 pages, March 2005) collects:
 "The Fitz" (with Ian Gibson, in 2000 AD #1257–1262, 2001)
 "Save the Fitz!" (with Ian Gibson, in 2000 AD prog 2003, 2002)
 "Robot Wars" (with Steve Roberts, in 2000 AD #1501–1506, 2006)Spector (with Carlos Ezquerra, in 2000 AD Sci-Fi Special, June 2019)Surfer (with Colin MacNeil, in Judge Dredd Megazine #439–444, 449–ongoing, 2022–2023)

Eagle
"Dan Dare: The Return of the Mekon", co-written with Pat Mills and Barrie Tomlinson, art by Gerry Embleton, Ian Kennedy, #1–33, 1982
"Joe Soap", co-written with Alan Grant, photo-strip, #12–22, 1982
"Manix", co-written with Alan Grant (credited to Keith Law), photo-strip, #24–31, 1982
"Doomlord", co-written with Alan Grant, photo-strip, then traditional comic strip drawn by Eric Bradbury, 1982–1991
"The House of Daemon", co-written with Alan Grant, art by José Ortiz, #25–47, 1982–83
"Gil Hazzard – Codename Scorpio", co-written with Alan Grant, #49–67, 1983
"The Fists of Danny Pyke", co-written with Alan Grant (credited to D. Spence), art by John M. Burns
"Bloodfang", (credited to F. Martin Candor), art by Jim Baikie and Carlos Cruz, #116–127 and 129–158, 1983–84
"Computer Warrior", co-written with Alan Grant, 1985–88

Scream!
"The Thirteenth Floor", co-written with Alan Grant (credited to Ian Holland), art by José Ortiz, 1984; continued in Eagle"Monster", co-written with Alan Grant (credited to R. Clark), art by Jesus Redondo, 1984; continued in EagleRoy of the Rovers
"Dan Harker's War", co-written with Alan Grant, 1985

Marvel ComicsDoctor Who (with co-writer Pat Mills and art by Dave Gibbons, in Doctor Who Magazine #1–16 & 19–34, 1979–1980, collected in The Iron Legion, 2004):
 "The Iron Legion" (#1–8)
 "City of the Damned" (#9–16)
 "The Star Beast" (#19–26)
 "Dogs of Doom" (#27–34)The Chronicles of Genghis Grimtoad (with co-writer Alan Grant and art by Ian Gibson, in Strip (Marvel UK), 1990, collected as a Marvel Graphic Novel)
 The Last American (with co-author Alan Grant, and art by Mike McMahon, 4-issue mini-series, Epic Comics, 1990–1991, tpb, Com.x, 2004)

DC Comics
Work at DC Comics, and their imprints include:

 Outcasts (with co-author Alan Grant, and pencils by Cam Kennedy, 12-issue limited series, DC Comics, 1987–1988)Batman / Judge Dredd: Judgement on Gotham (1991)Batman vs. Judge Dredd: Vendetta in Gotham (DC / Fleetway, 1993)Chain Gang War (created with Dave Johnson. DC Comics 1993–1994. Ongoing monthly series cancelled after 12 issues.)
 Bob, the Galactic Bum (with co-author Alan Grant and art by Carlos Ezquerra, 4-issue mini-series, DC, 1995)Batman / Judge Dredd: The Ultimate Riddle (DC / Fleetway, 1995)Batman: Legends of the Dark Knight #101 (art by Carlos Ezquerra, DC, 1997)A History of Violence (with Vince Locke, Paradox Press, 1997)Batman / Judge Dredd: Die Laughing (with co-author Alan Grant, art by Glenn Fabry and Jim Murray, two-issue mini-series, DC, 1998)

Dark Horse Comics
Wagner has also worked at Dark Horse Comics on a number of their licensed properties:Aliens: Berserker (with Paul Mendoza, and Andy Mushynsky, 4-issue mini-series, Dark Horse, 1995, included in Aliens Omnibus, Volume 4, 384 pages, June 2008)Star Wars:Star Wars Omnibus: Shadows of the Empire (408 pages, Dark Horse, February 2010, Titan Books, April 2010) includes:Shadows of the Empire (with pencils by Kilian Plunkett and John Nadeau and inks by P. Craig Russell, 6-issue mini-series, 1996, tpb, 1997)Star Wars Omnibus: Boba Fett (494 pages, Dark Horse, April 2010, Titan Books, July 2010) includes:Boba Fett (with Cam Kennedy, 3-issue mini-series, Dark Horse Comics, 1995–1996, tpb, Boba Fett: Death, Lies, & Treachery, 1998)Boba Fett: Enemy of the Empire (112 pages, 1999) collects:
 "Enemy of the Empire" (with Ian Gibson, 4-issue mini-series)
 "Salvage" (with pencils by John Nadeau and inks by Jim Amash, Boba Fett ½ in  Wizard Magazine)
 "Sacrifice" (with Cam Kennedy, in Empire #7, 2003, collected in Boba Fett: Man With A Mission, Dark Horse, March 2007)
"The Jabba Tape" (with Kilian Plunkett, one-shot, 1998)Xena: Warrior Princess #1–8 (1999–2000):
 The Warrior Way of Death (with pencils by Joyce Chin, Clint Hilinski, Mike Deodato and Ivan Reis and inks by Walden Wong, Mike Deodato, Grant Nelson, tpb, collects Xena #1–3, 2000)
 Slave (with pencils by  Joyce Chin and Mike Deodato, Jr.and inks by Clint Hilinski, Fabiano Neves and Walden Wong, tpb, collects Xena #4–6, 2000)
 Blood and Shadows (with pencils by Davide Fabbri and Mike Deodato and inks by Mark Heike, Neil Nelson, tpb, collects Xena #7–10, 2001)

OthersThe Bogie Man (with co-author Alan Grant and art by Robin Smith):
 The Bogie Man (John Brown Publishing, 128 pages, 1991)
 Chinatoon (Toxic! #2–9, 1991, started by Cam Kennedy, redrawn and completed by Smith, Atomeka Press, 112 pages, 1993)
 The Manhattan Project (Toxic! #11–21, 1991, Tundra Publishing, 52 pages, 1992)
 The Bogie Man (collects the first volume and Chinatoon, Pocket Books, 224 pages, 1998)
  "Return to Casablanca" (Judge Dredd Megazine #227–233, 2005)The Crow (Top Dollar Comics, Kitchen Sink Press):
 City of Angels (with co-author David Goyer, and art by Dean Ormston (#1) and Phil Hester (#2–3), 3-issue mini-series, 1995, tpb, Titan Books, 1996)
 Dead Time (with co-author James O'Barr, and art by Alex Maleev, 3-issue mini-series, 1996, tpb, 96 pages, Titan Books, 1997, Kitchen Sink)Rok of the Reds (with Alan Grant and Dan Cornwell), Black Hearted Press, 2018
 Rok the God (with Alan Grant and Dan Cornwell), self-published, 2020

Notes

References

David Bishop Thrill Power Overload'' (Rebellion Developments, 260 pages, February 2007)

John Wagner at Barney 

John Wagner at Lambiek's Comiclopedia

Bibliographies of British writers
Science fiction bibliographies
Bibliographies by writer
Lists of comics by creator
Comics by John Wagner